For the Sake of Mankind is the second studio album by the Norwegian heavy metal band, Artch.

Track listing
"When Angels Cry" - 5:30
"Appologia" - 4:42
"Burn Down the Bridges" - 5:07
"Paradox" - 5:12
"To Whom It May Concern" - 4:19
"Titanic" - 4:40
"Confrontation" - 4:11
"Turn the Tables" - 4:59
"To Be or Not to Be" - 3:15
"Batteries Not Included" - 4:04
"Razamanaz" - 4:06 (Nazareth cover)

Personnel 
 Eiríkur Hauksson aka Eric Hawk – vocals
 Cato Olsen aka Cat Andrew – guitar
 Geir Nilssen aka Gill Neill – guitar
 Bernt A. Jansen aka Brent Jansen – bass
 Jørn Jamissen aka Jack Jamies – drums

References

1991 albums
Artch albums
Metal Blade Records albums